Sprott Molybdenum Participation Corporation was a dedicated commodity hedge fund created in April 2007 by Canadian investor Eric Sprott to invest in molybdenum assets. The primary investment objective of the corporation was to achieve capital appreciation by investing in securities of private and public companies that explore for, mine, and process molybdenum. The fund was listed on Toronto Stock Exchange under the ticker MLY.

Investments
The fund purchased shares of both molybdenum miners and the physical metal. Substantial investments were made into shares of Blue Pearl Mining, arguably the world's largest publicly traded, pure play molybdenum producer.

From April 2007, when Sprott raised C$200 million ($167.9 million) to January 2009, prices for molybdenum fell by 57 percent, and the fund’s value plunged 76 percent. As a result, the fund had to liquidate itself and distribute residual assets to shareholders.

See also
Gold exchange-traded fund
Minor metals
Uranium Participation Corporation

Rare materials as investments
Diamonds as an investment
Palladium as an investment
Platinum as an investment
Silver as an investment
Gold as an investment
Uranium as an investment

References

External links
Official website — closed
IPO for Sprott Molybdenum gets $36M lift
Welcome To The Sprott Molybdenum Participation Corp HUB On AGORACOM

Defunct hedge funds
Hedge fund firms in Canada